Miramichi-Bay du Vin was a provincial electoral district for the Legislative Assembly of New Brunswick, Canada.

Members of the Legislative Assembly

Election results

References

External links 
Website of the Legislative Assembly of New Brunswick

Politics of Miramichi, New Brunswick
Former provincial electoral districts of New Brunswick